Joseph L. White (December 19, 1932 – November 21, 2017) was Professor of Psychology and Psychiatry at the University of California, Irvine and "godfather" of the field of Black Psychology.

Early and personal life
Joseph White was born on December 19, 1932 in Lincoln, Nebraska to Dorothy Lee and Joseph L. White. At a very young age, his family moved to Minneapolis where they remained until White's mother sent him to San Francisco to live with his aunt after completing high school. White only intended to work as a waiter; however, his aunt, Reverend Margaret Brown suggested that he go to college.

His first wife and mother to his three children, Lori, Lisa, and Lynn, was Myrtle Escort White. His second wife of over thirty years was Lois White.

White died on 21 November 2017 from a heart attack on a plane while flying to visit his family in St. Louis, Missouri for Thanksgiving.

Education
Joseph White received his BA from San Francisco State University, and his PhD in clinical psychology at Michigan State University in 1961. When he went to San Francisco State the total cost of admission for him was $14.25. College was so affordable at that time in California that if a student did not have the money at that moment the student could sign a waiver promising to pay the current tuition and fees the next semester. White was always a good athlete in high school and that earned him a job working at a playground in a city neighborhood. This is where he found his love for psychology. Ivan Pavlov was an influential psychologist for White and he was very interested in learning about the unconscious mind. This would probably be his earliest influence in regards to psychology.

After he finished at San Francisco State, White served 24 months in the military. He did not immediately get accepted into graduate school. Luckily, San Francisco State was creating a Master's program and agreed to admit him to the program and help him gain admission to a doctorate program. Two years later, he was accepted at Michigan State.

White recalled the reactions of people in psychology to him as hesitant since he was the only Negro at the program. People did not think that Negro students had the advanced capacity to do graduate level work. He attempted to get some of his required classes waived because of his work at San Francisco State but Michigan State would not honor this request. He was well rounded and took many classes in his major at San Francisco and as a result ended up at the top of his class at Michigan State.

Career
While his main field of study was clinical psychology, Dr. White focused a lot of his attention on aiding and supporting disadvantaged students of color in their path to acquire knowledge by developing curriculum that caters to the needs of students of color. In his quest to reform the education system, White rejects the use of white middle class norms in determining the standards of education. While at California State University, Long Beach, White helped in establishing the Educational Opportunities Program (EOP) which became a program implemented across the California State University campuses.

In 1968, White helped found the Association of Black Psychologists along with a few other Black Psychologists during the 1968 conference of the American Psychological Association. "We cannot depend on them to define us. We have to take charge and define ourselves. We need to build our own psychology."  This quote was a result of the meeting of those few Black Psychologists who saw a need for change in how psychology is applied to Blacks.  During this same time, while serving as a professor and dean of undergraduate studies, White yielded to the needs of the students in helping to establish the first Black Studies Program during the 1968 strike at San Francisco State University.

In addition to his research, Joseph White was a professor who had been a practicing psychologist as well as a consultant. White had worked as a psychologist to five hospitals and three clinics in Southern California and over the years had served as a consultant for school districts, universities, private organizations, drug prevention programs, and government agencies.

"Toward a Black Psychology"
Joseph White's 1970 article "Toward a Black Psychology", published in Ebony Magazine, was a seminal document in the formation of African-American Psychology as a professional field and the rise of ethnic and cultural psychology.  The article argued that whatever the future of race relations and the destiny of Black people, the creation of a Black Psychology was necessary because the psychology created by White people could never adequately apply to African-Americans.  Dr. White went further to point out that the application of mainstream White psychology to Black people resulted in weakness-oriented deficit finding, rather than an accurate appraisal of the situation of people of African descent.

Awards
In 1994 Dr. White was awarded a Citation of Achievement in Psychology and Community Service from President Bill Clinton.  Dr. White was awarded an honorary Doctor of Laws from the University of Minnesota in 2007. Joseph White was Professor Emeritus of Psychology and Psychiatry at the University of California, Irvine where he spent most of his career. Governor Edmund G. Brown, Jr. appointed White as chairman to the California State Psychology Licensing Board where he served for three years and he was a member of the Board of Trustees of the Menninger Foundation in Topeka, Kansas. On May 23, 2008, Joseph L. White was honored as Alumnus of the year at San Francisco State University. White was also the recipient of the honorary degree Doctor of Laws from the Board of Regents of the University of Minnesota. This is the highest award given to individuals who are distinguished for their accomplishment in cultural affairs, public service or a field of knowledge and scholarship. In April 2017, Dr. White received the Lifetime Achievement Award from the California Psychological Association.

Works
 The Psychology of Blacks: An African-American Perspective with Thomas Anthony Parham, Prentice Hall, 1990, 
The Troubled Adolescent, Joseph L. White, Pergamon Press, 1989 , 
Black Man Emerging: Facing the Past and Seizing a Future in America with James H. Cones, Routledge, 1999, 9780415925723
The psychology of Blacks: an African-centered perspective, with Thomas Anthony Parham, Adisa Ajamu, Prentice Hall, 1999, 
Black Fathers: An Invisible Presence in America, with Michael E. Connor, Routledge, 2006, 
Building Multicultural Competency: Development, Training, and Practice, with Sheila Henderson, Rowman & Littlefield, 2008,

References

1932 births
2017 deaths
20th-century American psychologists
African-American psychologists
San Francisco State University alumni
20th-century African-American people
21st-century African-American people
People from Lincoln, Nebraska